Peder Bergenhammer Sørensen (3 June 1914 – 29 June 1944) was a member of the Danish resistance executed by the German occupying power.

Biography 

Sørensen was born in Maribo on 3 June 1914 as son of merchant William Bergenhammer Sørensen and wife Anne Petrine Nielsine Agnes née Jensen and baptized in Maribo Cathedral on the 19th Sunday after Trinity.

On 25 April 1939 in Gassum church he married the four years younger Kirstine Fiil as a brewery worker living in Gassum.

In 1942 in Hvidsten his wife gave birth on her birthday to a girl, who on the 19th Sunday after Trinity was baptized Gudrun Fiil Sørensen Møller in Gassum church.

While a brewery worker Sørensen became a member of the Hvidsten group.

The group helped the British Special Operations Executive parachute weapons and supplies into Denmark for distribution to the resistance.

In March 1944 the Gestapo made an "incredible number of arrests" including in the region of Randers Sørensen, his wife, her 17-year-old sister Gerda, her brother Niels and their father the "nationally known folklore collector and keeper of Hvidsten Inn Marius Fiil".

The following month De frie Danske reported that several arrestees from Hvidsten had been transferred from Randers to Vestre Fængsel.

On 29 June 1944 Sørensen, his father in law, his brother in law and five other members of the Hvidsten group were executed in Ryvangen.

After his death 

On 15 July 1944 De frie Danske reported on the execution of Sørensen, his father in law, his brother in law, the life sentence of his wife and the two-year sentence of his sister in law and lamented the profound loss of his mother in law. Six months later the January 1945 issue of the resistance newspaper Frit Danmark (Free Denmark) reported that on 29 June the previous year Sørensen and seven other named members of the Hvidsten group had been executed.

On 5 July 1945 Sørensen's remains and those of five others from the group were found in Ryvangen and transferred to the Department of Forensic Medicine of the university of Copenhagen. The remains of the two remaining executed members of the group, Marius Fiil and his son had been found in the same area three days before.

Alternatively, his remains were recovered on or before 3 July because on that day an inquest in the Department of Forensic Medicine of the university of Copenhagen showed that he was executed with gunshot wounds to the chest.

On 10 July he was together with the seven other executed group members cremated at Bispebjerg Cemetery.

In 1945 a memorial stone over the eight executed members of the Hvidsten group was raised near Hvidsten Inn.

Similarly a larger memorial stone for resistance members including the eight executed members of the Hvidsten group has been laid down in Ryvangen Memorial Park.

Portrayal in the media
 In the 2012 Danish drama film Hvidsten Gruppen (This Life) Peder Bergenhammer Sørensen is portrayed by Jesper Riefensthal.

References 

 
 

1914 births
1944 deaths
Danish people executed by Nazi Germany
Danish people of World War II
Danish resistance members
Resistance members killed by Nazi Germany
People from Lolland Municipality
People from Lolland